Alexander Michael Rossi (born September 25, 1991) is an American professional racing driver and podcast host. He currently competes full-time in the IndyCar Series, driving the No. 7 Chevrolet for Arrow McLaren. Rossi is best known for winning the 100th running of the Indianapolis 500 as a rookie in 2016. He previously drove for Andretti Autosport.

Rossi began his career in the United States before moving to Europe as a teenager to pursue a career in Formula One. He won four races in the developmental GP2 Series, one for EQ8 Caterham Racing in 2013, and three more for Racing Engineering in 2015. After serving as a test and development driver for Caterham F1 and Marussia F1, Rossi made his Formula One debut in 2015 for the renamed Manor Marussia F1 Team, driving in five Grands Prix, including his home Grand Prix in the United States, where he finished a season-best twelfth.

After failing to secure a full-time drive in Formula One for the 2016 season, Rossi returned to the U.S. to compete in the IndyCar Series for a team with combined resources from Andretti Autosport and Bryan Herta Autosport. Rossi won the 2016 Indianapolis 500 and finished eleventh in series points. Rossi returned to Andretti in 2017 and added a second career win at Watkins Glen International for his first road course win in IndyCar. His 2018 and 2019 seasons were his most successful to date, finishing second and third in the Drivers' Championship point standings those years respectively.

Career

Skip Barber
In 2005, after becoming IKF Grand National Champion in the 100cc Yamaha class, Rossi was semi-finalist in the Red Bull Formula One American Drivers search with a top 5 finish overall out of over 2,000 nationwide candidates.

In 2006 he was awarded the Skip Barber National Scholarship from Skip Barber Racing School to compete in the 2006 Skip Barber National Championship, where he finished third overall, becoming the youngest winner in Skip Barber National Championship history, at age 14.

Formula BMW
Rossi competed in the Formula BMW USA series in 2007, finishing third overall in the championship, with three wins and five podiums while driving for Team Apex Racing, USA.

For 2008, Rossi returned for his second year with the two-time Formula BMW championship-winning team EuroInternational. He won the overall championship, becoming the first American Formula BMW Champion in the Americas Championship, with ten wins from the fifteen races run.

Rossi completed the season as World Champion, winning the 2008 Formula BMW World Final at the Autódromo Hermanos Rodríguez circuit in Mexico City, beating the rookie Michael Christensen. Rossi was awarded a Formula One test with BMW Sauber F1 Team, along with European champion Esteban Gutiérrez.

International Formula Master
Rossi decided to move to compete in Europe in 2009. He chose to compete in the International Formula Master with Hitech Racing. After two rounds, Rossi moved over to ISR Racing for the remainder of the season. Rossi won three races throughout the season, all coming during reverse-grid races. The wins at Brno, Spa and Imola gave Rossi the second-highest tally of victories during the 2009 season, with Fabio Leimer (seven) winning more. Coupled with Pål Varhaug's sixth place in the final race at Imola, Rossi moved up to fourth overall in the championship, and the highest-placed rookie driver.

GP3 Series
In 2010, Rossi made the move to the new GP3 Series, competing for multiple-championship-winning team ART Grand Prix. He joined Pedro Nunes and Esteban Gutiérrez at the team, winning twice and finishing fourth in the series.

World Series by Renault

After a season in GP3, Rossi moved on to compete in the Formula Renault 3.5 Series with Fortec Motorsport. He was joined at the team by Brazilian driver and Italian Formula Three Champion César Ramos. He won the opening race of the season in Aragón and the second race at Le Castellet, and eventually placed third in the championship and top rookie driver, finishing behind Carlin drivers Robert Wickens and Jean-Éric Vergne.

Rossi stayed in the series for the 2012 season, but switched to newcomers Arden Caterham Motorsport, partnering Red Bull-backed driver Lewis Williamson.

GP2 Series

Rossi competed in the 2009–10 GP2 Asia Series. Having competed for Ocean Racing Technology at the first Abu Dhabi round, Rossi moved to Team Meritus for the remaining rounds. Rossi made a strong impression immediately finishing fourth in his début race, from thirteenth on the grid. Rossi finished ninth in the championship standings.

After his stint at the Formula Renault 3.5, Rossi made his GP2 Series debut in the Bahrain round in 2013 after replacing Chinese driver Ma Qinghua, he finished 3rd in his debut race. On July 16, 2014, Rossi announced he had departed Caterham's GP2 team, and later joined Campos Racing at the Hockenheimring, replacing Kimiya Sato. He joined Racing Engineering for the 2015 season opposite British rookie Jordan King, finishing second in the championship.

Formula One (2012–16)
Rossi was one of three drivers linked to the US-based Formula One team US F1 along with José María López and Jonathan Summerton. Rossi was contracted to be the reserve and test driver before the team folded. He has also tested the 2009-spec BMW Sauber F1.09 Formula One car as part of Formula One's young driver test in Jerez. This was earned for winning the Formula BMW World Final. This test earned Rossi his FIA Super License; at the time, he was the only American to hold one.

2012–14: Caterham

For the 2012 Formula One season, he joined Caterham F1 as a test driver alongside reserve driver Giedo van der Garde. At the Spanish round he drove Heikki Kovalainen's car in the first practice session, becoming the first American to drive in a Formula One session (during a race weekend) since Scott Speed at the 2007 European Grand Prix. In 2013, he drove for Caterham in the first practice session of the Canadian Grand Prix and at Silverstone in July for the young driver test. Later in the season, he again participated in the first practice session at the United States Grand Prix, his home race. In 2014, he drove the Caterham in the first practice session of the Canadian Grand Prix. Rossi departed Caterham following the departure of Tony Fernandes and the entrance of new Swiss and Middle Eastern investors in July 2014.

2014–16: Marussia/Manor
Following his departure from Caterham, Rossi joined Marussia F1 as reserve driver for the remainder of the 2014 season. He was initially set to make his Formula One debut at the Belgian Grand Prix, replacing British driver Max Chilton, although Marussia later reversed that decision. He later was set to replace the injured Jules Bianchi at the Russian Grand Prix, but Marussia later decided to only run a single car for Chilton.

Rossi continued as a reserve driver into 2015 for the newly formed Manor Marussia F1 Team. He finally made his debut at the Singapore Grand Prix. Rossi chose No. 53 as his career car number in honor of Herbie; his original choice was No. 16, which he used in his karting career, but the number was already claimed as a reserve number by Red Bull Racing. Rossi qualified 20th and last for his debut, but rallied to finish 14th, just ahead of teammate Will Stevens (15th), despite losing radio communication with his crew around the halfway point of the Grand Prix. Rossi would go on to enter five of the final seven races of the 2015 season. At the Japanese Grand Prix, Rossi finished 18th, again one place above Stevens. He would go on to equal Manor Marussia's best result of the season at his home race, the United States Grand Prix, finishing 12th, and becoming the first American driver to race at a track purpose-built for Formula One in the United States. Rossi then took 15th at the Mexican Grand Prix before completing his five-race stint at the Brazilian Grand Prix with a 19th-place finish.

Despite signing for Andretti Autosport in the IndyCar Series, Rossi returned as a reserve driver for the reformed Manor Racing for the 2016 season. After Rio Haryanto lost his ride at Manor following the German Grand Prix, Rossi was offered the opportunity to take his place as a full-time driver; however, he declined the offer, stating: "My management and I are in constant communications with Manor and we knew there might be an opportunity to race for the last half of the 2016 season. We gave it careful thought but declined the race seat due to my IndyCar contract." On October 3, 2016, Rossi confirmed he would give up his reserve driver role at Manor following the 2016 season to focus on the IndyCar Series full-time.

Sports car racing (2013–14, 2019–present)

2013: Sports car debut at Le Mans
In 2013, Rossi made his debut at the 24 Hours of Le Mans, driving for Greaves Motorsport in a Zytek Z11SN. He was signed as a replacement for Christian Zugel, who was prevented from participating by family and business matters. He and co-drivers Eric Lux and Tom Kimber-Smith finished 23rd overall.

2014: Daytona with DeltaWing

Rossi competed in the 2014 24 Hours of Daytona for the DeltaWing team, joining full-time drivers Andy Meyrick and Katherine Legge, along with eventual 2014 Indy Lights champion Gabby Chaves.

2019–20: Return to sports cars with Penske
On December 7, 2018, Rossi announced that he would be joining Acura Team Penske for both the 24 Hours of Daytona and the 12 Hours of Sebring in the 2019 IMSA WeatherTech SportsCar Championship. Rossi replaced fellow IndyCar driver Graham Rahal after Rahal was unable to get an adequate seat fitting to optimize his performance. Rossi teamed with fellow IndyCar Series driver Hélio Castroneves and sports car driver Ricky Taylor to finish third overall and in class at Daytona. The second half of the race was marred by non-stop rain, with Rossi conceding that the team's rivals were slightly stronger than them in wet conditions.

Rossi returned to Penske's No. 7 Acura for the 2020 24 Hours of Daytona. Rossi's team was compromised less than four hours into the race when Castroneves was involved in an accident with Harry Tincknell.

2021–present: Endurance with Wayne Taylor Racing
On November 23, 2020, Wayne Taylor Racing announced that Rossi would be the team's third driver for the endurance races, starting with the 2021 24 Hours of Daytona. Rossi co-drove the team's No. 10 Acura ARX-05 to the overall win with former Penske teammates Castroneves and Taylor, as well as Filipe Albuquerque. Rossi, Taylor, and Albuquerque went on to win the 2021 Michelin Endurance Cup.

IndyCar Series (2016–present)

Andretti Autosport (2016–2022)

2016: Indianapolis 500 win

While Rossi grew up watching the IndyCar Series as his favorite form of racing, he had previously claimed to having little interest in racing in it himself, particularly because of hesitance to race on ovals. Nevertheless, after Manor announced Pascal Wehrlein and Rio Haryanto as the team's 2016 drivers, Rossi made the switch to the IndyCar Series with Andretti Autosport for the 2016 season. Prior to signing with Andretti, Rossi had previously visited with Dale Coyne Racing in 2014 and admitted he was "very, very close" to signing with them for the 2015 IndyCar season.

Because the deal was finalized so late, Rossi missed the majority of preseason testing, only getting to complete one session at Sebring International Raceway. Rossi made his IndyCar debut at the season-opening Grand Prix of St. Petersburg, qualifying in the rear of the field in 19th and finishing as the highest-placed rookie in 12th. Rossi then made his oval debut at the next race in Phoenix, running as high as seventh before brushing the wall in the final laps of the race. The highlight of Rossi's first season with the team was winning the Indianapolis 500 after starting from the 11th position on the grid. Rossi was the top rookie in qualifying for the race and led the final few laps as the cars ahead of him on track ran low on fuel and pitted. Rossi managed his fuel over the final stint to win, then ran dry after the finish and had to be towed to victory lane. Rossi would later earn a second top-five finish at the season finale at Sonoma Raceway. Rossi was named the series' 2016 Rookie of the Year on September 19.

2017: End-of-season breakthrough
On October 3, Rossi announced he would return to Andretti for the 2017 season, signing a multi-year contract. At Long Beach, Rossi was running in second place when his engine failed. Rossi started the defense of his Indianapolis 500 victory by qualifying on the front row for the race. He spent much of the first half of the race amongst the leaders, but finished seventh after experiencing fueling issues. Later in the season, Rossi drove to a second-place finish in the Honda Indy Toronto after starting in eighth in what he called a "breakthrough" race for his team. It was his first podium of the 2017 season. At Pocono, Rossi earned his third career podium by finishing third despite encountering a problem with his car's fuel-mixture knob. On September 1, Rossi confirmed that he would remain with Andretti through at least the 2019 season; despite having signed a multi-year extension after 2016, Rossi had been considering a move to Schmidt Peterson Motorsports due to his loyalty to Honda, but re-signed with Andretti once the team confirmed they would continue using Honda engines in the future. The next day, Rossi earned his first career pole position at Watkins Glen International; he would go on to win the race as well for his second career victory.

2018-2019: Championship contender
On December 7, 2017, Andretti Autosport announced plans for Rossi to swap car numbers with teammate Marco Andretti for the 2018 season. Rossi moved to the No. 27 team while Andretti took over the Herta-partnered No. 98.

Rossi's 2018 season began with a controversial third-place finish at the Grand Prix of St. Petersburg. Rossi was running in second on the final restart and attempted to pass leader Robert Wickens in the first turn, but got loose and made contact with Wickens, who in turn retired from the race. Rossi argued that while he "[felt] bad" about the contact, he also believed Wickens' defense of the lead forced him into the marbles, causing his car to get loose. Wickens, however, said he "expected more" from Rossi, and proceeded to call his move "desperate." Rossi's driving was further criticized by NBC Sports' Jerry Bonkowski, who opined that he "ruined what was a near-perfect day — make that weekend — for another driver." Ironically, Rossi would again battle with Wickens in the closing stages of the following race at Phoenix, securing another third-place finish behind race winner Josef Newgarden and Wickens. After the podium celebration, both Wickens and Rossi made light of the St. Petersburg clash; Rossi stated that Wickens "should definitely have two podiums right now," to which the Canadian jokingly replied, "About time you said it!" The following week, Rossi qualified on pole position for the Grand Prix of Long Beach. He converted the pole position into his third career win, leading race runner-up and 2014 IndyCar Series champion Will Power to call Rossi "a standout of the field right now in every respect."

Rossi began the Indianapolis 500 from the last row on the grid, starting in 32nd place. He completed a series of impressive overtakes throughout the race, leading him to a fourth-place finish. The following week in Detroit, Rossi finished third in race one. He then qualified on pole for the second race and led 46 of the first 63 laps; however, he was pressured late in the race by teammate Ryan Hunter-Reay. Rossi preceded to lock his brakes, overshooting the upcoming turn and leading to a puncture. He was forced to pit, reentering the track in 13th and finishing in 12th. Rossi rebounded later in the season to win the pole and the race at Mid-Ohio, using a two-stop strategy. The win moved Rossi into second in the Drivers' Championship standings, 46 points behind Scott Dixon. Rossi won the following race at Pocono as well, though the event was overshadowed by a serious accident early in the race involving Wickens (who was injured and airlifted to a local hospital), resulting in a red flag period. At Gateway, Rossi used fuel strategy to finish second, gaining a few points on Dixon. After an eighth-place finish at Portland, Rossi entered the final race at Sonoma 29 points behind Dixon. At the start, he broke his front wing after contact with Andretti, dropping him back in the field. He recovered to place seventh in the race, finishing a total of 57 points behind Dixon in the championship.

Rossi began the 2019 season with a fifth-place finish at St. Petersburg. He scored his first win of 2019 at Long Beach, where he repeated his success from the previous season. Rossi's 20-second margin of victory over Newgarden was the largest margin of victory at Long Beach since Al Unser Jr.'s 23-second margin in 1995. He dedicated the victory to his grandfather; the win came on the day Rossi learned of his death.

At the 2019 Indianapolis 500, Rossi was in contention for the win before encountering a fuel pump problem in the pits on lap 137. The delay resulted in a 23-second pit stop, which likely would have taken him out of contention had Marcus Ericsson not spun entering the pit lane, forcing a caution flag. On the ensuing restart, Rossi fell from fifth to sixth place, while also being seventh in line as Oriol Servià, a lapped car, was in front of him. Rossi was then held up and blocked by Servia (he would later call his actions "unacceptable" and "one of the most disrespectful things I've ever seen in a racecar"), eventually shaking his fist at the Spanish driver as he finally passed him. Rossi eventually recovered to pass Simon Pagenaud for the lead and seemed to have the advantage as Pagenaud was in danger of not being able to make it to the end of the race on fuel, but a late caution nullified that advantage. Rossi's Honda lacked the horsepower of Pagenaud's Chevrolet, which was ultimately the deciding factor as he finished the race in second behind Pagenaud.

Rossi's second-place finish at Indianapolis sparked a run of three such finishes in four races as he also finished second at the first Detroit race and at Texas. At Road America in June, Rossi broke through to win with a 28.4-second margin of victory over second-place Will Power. Power stated after the race that he "never actually saw" Rossi due to the length of the gap between the two drivers. At Pocono, Rossi was involved in a first-lap incident with Takuma Sato, with Rossi calling Sato's driving "disgraceful" and saying "I can't even begin to understand after last year how Takuma thinks any sort of driving like that is acceptable." Rossi would go on to enter the final race at Laguna Seca second in points before fading to third behind Newgarden and Pagenaud

2020–2021: Struggles

In 2020 Rossi recorded no wins for the first time in his IndyCar career, but scored five podiums. 2021 proved to be a struggle for both Rossi and Andretti Autosport, as he once again failed to win any races that year and only secured one podium finish at Portland.

2022: A bounceback season
2022 started slowly for Rossi, with no podiums or victories before the Indianapolis 500. Following the Indianapolis 500 Andretti Autosport announced that Rossi would leave the team at the end of the 2022 season and would be replaced by Kyle Kirkwood. The following day Rossi announced he had signed a contract with Arrow McLaren SP for 2023 and beyond.

Rossi's performance improved significantly following the Indianapolis 500. He finished second to Will Power in Detroit and finished third at the following race at Road America. After struggling in the following rounds, Rossi finally broke through on July 30, 2022, winning the Gallagher Grand Prix on the IMS Road Course which ended his 49-race winless drought in the IndyCar Series.

Arrow McLaren SP (2023-) 
On the 3rd of June 2022. It was announced that Rossi would be joining Arrow McLaren SP for the 2023 season.

Off-road racing (2018–19, 2021)
Rossi competed in his first ever Baja 1000 in 2018, driving with Jeff Proctor in the No. 709 Honda Ridgeline, becoming the fifth Indianapolis 500 winner to participate in the race. Rossi explained that he was eager to try a different racing series, saying, "It's just one of those iconic races. There's a Honda connection, so [when offered the ride] I just figured, 'Why not?' I'm pretty excited about it. It's something new, something different. I'm looking forward to the experience." Rossi nearly collided with a spectator's car that was travelling the wrong way on the course around 33 miles into the race. His team placed second in their class in the final results.

Rossi returned to the Baja 1000 in 2019. Rossi and Proctor's truck was leading when Rossi rolled over the vehicle. The truck was able to continue for about 100 miles after the crash but eventually retired due to mechanical problems.

After skipping the 2020 edition due to scheduling clashes, another Baja 1000 start came in 2021. Sharing the Ridgeline with Proctor, Richard Glaszczak, and Steve Hengeveld, Rossi's team claimed the Class 7 victory.

Supercars Championship (2019)
On August 15, 2019, Rossi announced plans to make his debut in the Bathurst 1000 in October, competing with fellow IndyCar Series driver James Hinchcliffe as a wildcard entry for Walkinshaw Andretti United, a partnership between Andretti Autosport and United Autosports. The pair started the race on the back row of the grid in 25th, finishing 19th before being promoted to 18th after a penalty demoted DJR Team Penske's Fabian Coulthard from sixth to 21st.

Personal life
Rossi was born in Auburn, California, and raised in Nevada City, often waking up at 4 a.m. local time on Sunday mornings to watch the Formula One races in Europe. He graduated from Auburn's Forest Lake Christian High School at the age of 16 in order to begin pursuing his European racing career. He is a fan of the National Football League's New England Patriots; despite not growing up in Boston, Rossi explains, "I've been a Patriots fan really since 2009, solely because of when I was living in Europe, the only NFL games I could watch on the television package they had at the time was Patriots or Green Bay Packers games. I was originally a San Francisco 49ers fan, but then considering I didn't watch any of the games for about seven years, I switched to being a Patriots fan despite not being from Boston." Rossi serves as a TAG Heuer ambassador alongside former NFL quarterback Tom Brady.

Rossi is a Protestant Christian. He cites his two most important life influences as God and his parents, adding, "I believe there's always a greater plan. I feel that driving race cars and being involved in Formula One and motorsports is my opportunity to share my beliefs." Rossi describes having his faith while growing up as "something that was hugely important to me. That carried all the way through my entire childhood. I was very fortunate to be a product of a Christian family with my mom and dad and grandmother." He was a speaker at the Fellowship of Christian Athletes' "Nights of Champions" program in 2017. When asked in mid-2019 about his status at Andretti Autosport beyond the end of that season, Rossi replied that his career path was "in God's hands."

Media appearances
Rossi's 2016 Indianapolis 500 win earned him a nomination at the 2016 ESPY Awards for Best Driver. He attended the awards ceremony on July 13, though the award went to NASCAR's 2015 Sprint Cup Series champion, Kyle Busch.

In March 2017, Rossi was a guest on an episode of Harry Connick Jr.'s eponymous talk show, Harry. He has appeared on The Rich Eisen Show on two occasions, in July 2016 after winning the Indianapolis 500 and again in January 2018.

Rossi appeared on the 30th season of CBS' The Amazing Race with fellow IndyCar driver Conor Daly as his teammate. The pair won the fourth leg of the race, though they were eventually eliminated, finishing in fourth place. On April 19, 2018, he appeared on the season four premiere of CNBC's Jay Leno's Garage alongside Tanner Foust.

Rossi cohosts the podcast Off Track with Hinch and Rossi, with fellow driver, James Hinchcliffe.

Helmet
Rossi's Manor Marussia F1 helmet featured a red, white, and blue design with prominent sponsorship placement for Alaska Coffee Roasting, one of his longtime personal sponsors. He also ran a "#JB17" decal on his visor honoring his former teammate, Jules Bianchi. Since moving to IndyCar with Andretti, Rossi has continued running the #JB17 decal, though it has since been moved to an area just below the visor on either side of the helmet. The basic design remains similar to his helmet from his brief Formula One career, though the blue background has changed to a combination of black and gray, and additional sponsorship placements have been added to represent his partnerships with TAG Heuer and Honda. For the 2018 Indianapolis 500, TAG Heuer tapped street artist Alec Monopoly to design Rossi's helmet for the race. The helmet featured a more colorful design with graphics meant to resemble street art.

In 2020, Rossi used some of his helmets to raise awareness for charitable causes. After his Bathurst 1000 debut, Rossi auctioned off his helmet, donating the proceeds to Wires Wildlife Rescue in aid of the Australian bushfires. His Indianapolis 500 helmet in August was designed by TAG Heuer to honor frontline workers and heroes in the midst of the COVID-19 pandemic.

Racing record

Career summary

† – As Rossi was a guest driver, he was ineligible to score points.                            
* Season still in progress.

Complete GP3 Series results
(key) (Races in bold indicate pole position) (Races in italics indicate fastest lap)

Complete Formula Renault 3.5 Series results
(key) (Races in bold indicate pole position) (Races in italics indicate fastest lap)

 Did not finish, but was classified as he had completed more than 90% of the race distance.

Complete Formula One results
(key) (Races in bold indicate pole position) (Races in italics indicates fastest lap)

Complete GP2 Series results
(key) (Races in bold indicate pole position) (Races in italics indicate fastest lap)

Complete GP2 Asia Series results
(key) (Races in bold indicate pole position) (Races in italics indicate fastest lap)

Complete GP2 Final results
(key) (Races in bold indicate pole position) (Races in italics indicate fastest lap)

Complete FIA World Endurance Championship results

24 Hours of Le Mans results

Complete IMSA SportsCar Championship results
(key)

* Season still in progress.

24 Hours of Daytona

American open–wheel racing

IndyCar Series
(key)

* Season still in progress.

Indianapolis 500

Complete Bathurst 1000 results

References

External links

1991 births
Living people
People from Auburn, California
Marussia Formula One drivers
American Formula One drivers
American people of Italian descent
American Protestants
Racing drivers from California
Formula BMW USA drivers
Formula BMW Europe drivers
International Formula Master drivers
GP2 Asia Series drivers
American GP3 Series drivers
World Series Formula V8 3.5 drivers
FIA Institute Young Driver Excellence Academy drivers
GP2 Series drivers
24 Hours of Le Mans drivers
FIA World Endurance Championship drivers
24 Hours of Daytona drivers
IndyCar Series drivers
WeatherTech SportsCar Championship drivers
International Kart Federation drivers
Indianapolis 500 drivers
Indianapolis 500 winners
The Amazing Race (American TV series) contestants
Indianapolis 500 Rookies of the Year
EuroInternational drivers
Hitech Grand Prix drivers
ISR Racing drivers
Ocean Racing Technology drivers
Team Meritus drivers
ART Grand Prix drivers
Fortec Motorsport drivers
Caterham Racing drivers
Greaves Motorsport drivers
Campos Racing drivers
Racing Engineering drivers
Manor Motorsport drivers
Andretti Autosport drivers
Team Penske drivers
Wayne Taylor Racing drivers
United Autosports drivers
Bryan Herta Autosport drivers
Arden International drivers
Arrow McLaren SP drivers